The following are the national records in speed skating in the United States maintained by the United States' national speed skating federation USSpeedskating.

Men

Women

References
General
 National Records 29 November 2022 updated
Specific

External links
 USSpeedskating web site

National records in speed skating
Speed skating
Records
Speed skating-related lists
Speed skating